Micropterix purpureopennella is a species of moth belonging to the family Micropterigidae. It was described by Heath in 1986. It is known from Algeria.

References

Micropterigidae
Moths described in 1986
Endemic fauna of Algeria
Moths of Africa